Långshyttan is a locality situated in Hedemora Municipality, Dalarna County, Sweden with 1,671 inhabitants in 2010.

See also 
 Rällingsberg mining area

References 

Populated places in Dalarna County
Populated places in Hedemora Municipality